Moment Bends is the fourth studio album by Australian indie pop band Architecture in Helsinki. It was released in Australia on 8 April 2011 and in the United States on 3 May 2011. The album was recorded in a rented studio in Melbourne, nicknamed "Buckingham Palace" after a photo mural of Fleetwood Mac's Lindsey Buckingham the band hung on the wall. The project had previously been given the working title Vision Revision. The first single released from the album was "Contact High", although "That Beep", which is included on the album, was released as an EP in 2008.

At the J Awards of 2011, the album was nominated for Australian Album of the Year.

Critical reception

Moment Bends received mixed to positive reviews from critics. At Metacritic, which assigns a weighted mean rating out of 100 to reviews from mainstream critics, the album received an average score of 61, based on 14 reviews, indicating "generally favorable reviews". Heather Phares of AllMusic labelled the album a "return to form" and more focused than its predecessor. Eric Grandy of Pitchfork Media gave the album a score of 6.5, noting its indebtedness to "lite-FM 80s", while praising "Contact High" as a "terrific pop song", though he felt the rest of the record was uneven.

Slant Magazine's Kevin Liedel expressed confusion with the album, asserting it was a "good bet that after only one track of Moment Bends, most longtime fans will have their brows furrowed." He added that "it's difficult to gauge whether or not the album is intentionally bad." Uncut magazine dismissed it as "the kind of glossily produced 'perfect pop' you can spin a dozen times without ever remembering a single tune."

In December 2011, it was announced that Moment Bends was voted number eight in triple j's 2011 Album Poll.

Track listing

Personnel
 Architecture in Helsinki – production
 Max Doyle – band portrait
 Haima Marriott – engineer, mastering, mixing, production
 Metz + Racine – cover image
 Greg Moore – mastering
 People Collective – cover design
 François Tétaz – co-production

Charts

Weekly charts

Year-end charts

References

2011 albums
Architecture in Helsinki albums
Modular Recordings albums